Charles Magill Conrad (December 24, 1804 – February 11, 1878) was a Louisiana politician who served in the United States Senate, United States House of Representatives, and Confederate Congress.  He was Secretary of War under President Millard Fillmore and, briefly, Franklin Pierce, from 1850 until 1853. Conrad also briefly acted as the United States Secretary of State following the tenure of Daniel Webster.

Biography
Charles Magill Conrad was born in Winchester, Virginia, in 1804, moved to Mississippi with his family as a boy, and later moved to Louisiana. He was educated under a Dr. Huld in New Orleans. He was appointed to the U.S. Senate in April 1842 to fill the unexpired term of Alexandre Mouton, serving to March 1843, and was defeated for reelection in his own right. He later served in the House of Representatives from 1849 to 1850, resigning to accept appointment as Secretary of War in Fillmore's cabinet.  Conrad remained in charge of the War Department from August 15, 1850, to March 7, 1853. He was a leader of the secession movement in Louisiana in December 1860. During the American Civil War, under the Confederate States of America, he served as a delegate to the Provisional Constitution of the Confederate States as a member of the Provisional Congress of the Confederate States, and as a representative from Louisiana to the Confederate Congress, 1862–1864. Following the war, he resumed the practice of law. He died in New Orleans in 1878.

See also
 List of United States senators from Louisiana

References

External links
 Charles Conrad biography at the United States Army Center of Military History
 
 

1804 births
1878 deaths
19th-century American politicians
Politicians from Winchester, Virginia
Deputies and delegates to the Provisional Congress of the Confederate States
Fillmore administration cabinet members
Members of the Confederate House of Representatives from Louisiana
Signers of the Confederate States Constitution
Signers of the Provisional Constitution of the Confederate States
United States Secretaries of War
United States senators from Louisiana
Whig Party members of the United States House of Representatives from Louisiana
Whig Party United States senators
Acting United States Secretaries of State
Southern Historical Society